Robert L. Nipper (February 15, 1903 – October 16, 1993) was an American college football player and coach.
He served as the head football coach at DePauw University in 1946, compiling a record of 1–5–2. Nipper died on October 16, 1993.

Head coaching record

College

References

External links
 

1903 births
1993 deaths
American men's basketball players
Butler Bulldogs baseball players
Butler Bulldogs football coaches
Butler Bulldogs football players
Butler Bulldogs men's basketball players
DePauw Tigers football coaches
High school football coaches in Indiana
Sportspeople from Fort Wayne, Indiana
Players of American football from Fort Wayne, Indiana